"You Mean the World to Me" is a song by British singer-songwriter Freya Ridings. It was released as a single, alongside Ridings' debut EP You Mean the World to Me, on 1 March 2019, through record labels Good Soldier Songs and Capitol Records, being the fourth single from the project. The song was written by Ridings and Kieron Mcintosh, and produced by American musician Greg Kurstin. The song is also included on Ridings' debut album, Freya Ridings, as the fourth single of the album.

Music video
The single was released alongside a music video for the track. The video was directed by Game of Thrones actress Lena Headey, and features Game of Thrones actress Maisie Williams.

Track listing

Charts

References

External links
 

2019 songs
2019 singles
Freya Ridings songs
Capitol Records singles
Song recordings produced by Greg Kurstin